Andrew Neal (born 11 October 1999) is an English cricketer. He made his first-class debut on 26 March 2019, for Leeds/Bradford MCCU against Derbyshire, as part of the Marylebone Cricket Club University fixtures.

References

External links
 

1999 births
Living people
English cricketers
Hertfordshire cricketers
Leeds/Bradford MCCU cricketers
Place of birth missing (living people)
English cricketers of the 21st century